Tethya samaaii, also known as the red golf ball sponge, is a species of sea sponge belonging to the family Tethyidae. It is spherical in shape and grows to about 6 cm in diameter. It is reddish in colour. It appears to be endemic to the west coast of South Africa and has been found in 12m of water.

References 

Animals described in 2011